The Roman Catholic Diocese of Barreiras is a diocese located in the city of Barreiras in the Ecclesiastical province of Feira de Santana in Brazil.

History
 May 21, 1979: Established as Diocese of Barreiras from the Diocese of Barra

Bishops
Bishops of Barreiras (Latin rite)
Ricardo José Weberberger, O.S.B. (21 May 1979 – 17 August 2010)
Josafa Menezes da Silva (15 December 2010 - 9 October 2019), appointed Archbishop of Vitória da Conquista, Bahia

Other priests of this diocese who became bishops
Paulo Romeu Dantas Bastos, appointed Bishop of Alagoinhas, Bahia in 2002
Eraldo Bispo da Silva, appointed Bishop of Patos, Paraiba in 2012

References
 GCatholic.org
 Catholic Hierarchy
 Diocese website (Portuguese) 

Roman Catholic dioceses in Brazil
Christian organizations established in 1979
Barreiras, Roman Catholic Diocese of
Roman Catholic dioceses and prelatures established in the 20th century
Barreiras